Iris and the Lieutenant is a 1946 Swedish drama film directed by Alf Sjöberg and starring Mai Zetterling, Alf Kjellin and Åke Claesson. The film boosted Zetterling's international profile. Shortly afterwards she moved to Britain to make Frieda (1947).

The film is adapted from a 1934 novel by the same title, written by Olle Hedberg.

Cast
 Mai Zetterling as Iris Mattson, mrs Asp's maid.
 Alf Kjellin as Robert Motander, the lieutenant.
 Åke Claesson as Oscar Motander, Robert's father.
 Holger Löwenadler as Baltzar Motander, Robert's brother.
 Margareta Fahlén as Greta Motander, Baltzar's wife.
 Ingrid Borthen as Malin 'Mary' Wallbeck, Robert's half-sister.
 Einar Axelsson as Frans Wallbeck, Mary's husband.
 Gull Natorp as Ebba Asp, Robert's aunt.
 Stig Järrel as Harald Montander, Robert's cousin.
 Peter Lindgren as Svante Montander, Roberts cousin.
 Magnus Kesster as Emil Gustell.

References

External links
 

1946 films
Swedish drama films
1940s Swedish-language films
1946 drama films
Swedish black-and-white films
Films directed by Alf Sjöberg
Films based on Swedish novels
Films scored by Lars-Erik Larsson
1940s Swedish films